Damber Singh Gurung (23 January 1900– 7 April 1948) was an Indian politician, lawyer and social worker. He founded the Akhil Bharatiya Gorkha League, a political party, in 1943. Born in Kalimpong, West Bengal, Gurung represented the Indian Gorkha community in the Constituent Assembly of India till his death in 1948, after which Ari Bahadur Gurung took his place.

References

People from Kalimpong district
1915 births
1948 deaths
20th-century Indian lawyers
West Bengal politicians
Members of the Constituent Assembly of India
Indian Gorkhas
Gurung people